I'm Getting My Act Together and Taking It on the Road is a musical with music by Nancy Ford and book and lyrics by Gretchen Cryer. The show premiered Off-Broadway in 1978.

Productions
The musical was produced by Joseph Papp and the New York Shakespeare Festival at The Public Theater, opening on June 14, 1978 and closing on March 15, 1981 at the Circle-in-the-Square (Downtown)after 1165 performances. Directed by Word Baker, the musical featured Gretchen Cryer as Heather; Nancy Ford appeared later in the run as Heather, as did Betty Buckley, Virginia Vestoff, Carol Hall, Betty Aberlin and Phyllis Newman.

The show also had a 1981 West End production.

The show was presented by Encores! Off-Center at New York City Center in a semi-staged production in July 2013. Directed by Kathleen Marshall, the cast featured Jennifer Sanchez, Christina Sajous and Renée Elise Goldsberry.

Landi Oshinowo, a West End actress, played Heather in the production's limited run at the Off-West End Jermyn Street Theatre in July 2016. Matthew Gould served as the show's director. The show's first UK revival was with this production.

Concept
The lead, Heather, is a 39-year-old divorcée attempting a comeback as a pop star.  Generally considered a feminist vehicle, the plot centers around her displaying new material for her manager without relying on showbiz clichés. However, "The collaborators are emphatic that they never meant the musical to be a feminist declaration. 'We were writing about relationships between men and women, not about women’s roles in society as a whole,' explains Ford."

Synopsis
Manager Joe Epstein returns from a trip and finds his star Heather Jones on stage at a nightclub, singing her own songs about the emancipation of women, together with the two singers Alice and Cheryl and the band. She told Joe Epstein that this would be her new show. Joe, who had been Heather's friend for a long time, reacted angrily to Heather's change, but he was not able to persuade Heather to go back to her usual role. Almost 40 years old, she feels that the time has come for a change. The songs she is singing now are touching Joe in an unpleasant way, because they remind him of the way he treats his own wife. Heather is determined to support women's liberation; she splits up with her manager and goes on to perform her own show.

Popular culture
The play was parodied by Andrea Martin and Catherine O'Hara on Second City Television as "I'm Taking My Own Head, Screwing It On Right, and No Guy's Gonna Tell Me it Ain't" in 1981.

Cast

New York production
Heather Jones - Gretchen Cryer
Joe Epstein, Manager - Joel Fabiani
Alice - Margot Rose
Cheryl - Betty Aberlin
Jake - Don Scardino, (created by Kevin Weyl who took the role through previews, and James Mellon taking over the role before the opening at Circle in the Square)
The Band
Piano - Scott Berry
Guitar - Lee Grayson
Drums - Bob George
Bass/Flute - Dean Swenson

London production
Heather Jones - Diane Langton
Joe Epstein, Manager - Ben Cross
Alice - Megg Nicol
Cheryl - Nicky Croydon
Jake - Greg Martyn
The Band
Musical Director - Stuart Pedlar
Guitar - John Murphy
Drums - Tony Layzell
Bass - Bernard Shaw

Songs
Natural High
Smile
Miss America
Strong Woman Number
Dear Tom
Old Friend
In a Simple Way I Love You
Put in a Package and Sold
Feel the Love
Lonely Lady
Happy Birthday
If Only Things Was Different (Added for London Production)

Reception
Reviews were generally negative. In the New York Times, Richard Eder wrote “Self-celebration is the affliction of I'm Getting My Act. Its songs and skits spell out the conflicts—the little girl who has to smile for her daddy; the wife who has to pick up her husband's socks and talk baby talk to him; the liberated women who find that men don't much like them—with little individual perception, imagination or rigor. The lyrics, and the music, are effortless and not in the best sense of the word.”  Despite negative reviews, the play performed well with audiences and ran for almost three years.

References

External links
 Synopsis and song list

Off-Broadway musicals
1978 musicals